Vakinankaratra is a region in central Madagascar. The capital of the region is Antsirabe.

History
The kingdom of Vakinankaratra, known as the kingdom of the river Andrantsay, was founded at the beginning of the 17th century by Andrianony, a prince originally from Alasora, south of Antananarivo. The capital of the kingdom used to be Fivavahana in today's Betafo District.

The last ruler of the Kingdom of Andrantsay was Andriamanalinarivo who was on the throne when Imerina king Andrianampoinimerina conquered the area with the help of the young prince Radama at the beginning of the 19th century. The territory was integrated into the Merina Kingdom under the new name Vakinankaratra.

During the colonial period the centre of the region shifted to Antsirabe.

Population
Vakinankaratra is the second most populous region of Madagascar and it has the second highest population density, only beaten by Analamanga, where the national capital and biggest city, Antananarivo, is located. In 2018, Vakinankaratra had a population of 2,074,358 and an average density of 117.0 people per km². The vast majority of the population belongs to the Merina ethnic group.

Economy
Vakinankaratra generates 10% of the PIB of Madagascar. There is an important textile industry and it is the principal bassin of legume production of the island. It also supplies 65% of the milk produced in Madagascar.

Geography

Vakinankaratra is situated in the central highlands of Madagascar. It borders the region of Bongolava in the northwest, Itasy in the north, Analamanga in the northeast, Alaotra Mangoro and Atsinanana in the east, Amoron'i Mania in the south, and Menabe to the west.

A number of precious minerals are found in Vakinankaratra, including Ferrocolumbite, Liddicoatite, and Londonite.

Bodies of Water
Lake Tritriva (15 km from Antsirabe)
Lake Andraikiba (7 km from Antsirabe)
The Mania River flows south of Antsirabe.

Protected Area
Manjakatompo Ankaratra New Protected Area

Administrative divisions
Vakinankaratra Region is divided into seven districts, which are sub-divided into 89 communes.

 Ambatolampy District - 19 communes
 Antanifotsy District - 13 communes
 Antsirabe I District - 1 commune
 Antsirabe II District - 20 communes
 Betafo District - 18 communes
 Faratsiho District - 9 communes
 Mandoto District - 9 communes

Transport

Airport
Antsirabe Airport

See also
 Antananarivo Province

References

External links
 Région Vakinankaratra Official site in French.
 Tourism Official tourism site of Vakinankaratra.

 
Regions of Madagascar